Keraymonia is a genus of flowering plants belonging to the family Apiaceae.

Its native range is East Himalayas, Nepal, and Tibet.

The genus name of Keraymonia is in honour of Monique Keraudren  (1928–1981), an English painter and illustrator.
It was first described and published in Candollea Vol.40 on page 528 in 1985.

Species, according to Kew:
Keraymonia cortiformis 
Keraymonia nipaulensis 
Keraymonia pinnatifolia 
Keraymonia triradiata

References

Apioideae
Plants described in 1985
Flora of East Himalaya
Flora of Nepal
Flora of Tibet
Apioideae genera